Eqbal Mehdi (1 April 1946, Amroha, British India – 19 May 2008, Karachi, Pakistan) was a Pakistani painter artist. He is famous for his pen drawings.

Early life
Eqbal Mehdi was born to Syed Mir Ali, in Amroha, then British India (now India). Mehdi and his brother moved to Pakistan during the late 1950s.

Art career
Eqbal Mehdi was a self-taught artist. He has taught many people the art of painting in India and Pakistan. Mustajab Shelle of Amroha, India and Siraj Uddun Dehlvi of Pakistan are his students. He was an artist for Lail o Nahar, and also did illustrations for another magazine, Sab Rang.

Art exhibits
 Arts Council of Pakistan Karachi solo exhibit back in 1969

Death
Eqbal Mehdi died in Karachi on 19 May 2008 from liver and heart disease. He was married and had two children.

Awards
 Pride of Performance Award by the President of Pakistan

References

External links
 Eqbal mehdi paintings

1946 births
2008 deaths
People from Amroha
Muhajir people
Pakistani Shia Muslims
Recipients of the Pride of Performance
Artists from Karachi
20th-century Pakistani painters